Phostria hesusalis is a moth in the family Crambidae. It was described by Francis Walker in 1859. It is found in Cameroon, the Republic of the Congo, the Democratic Republic of the Congo, Equatorial Guinea, Nigeria, Sierra Leone and Togo.

References

Phostria
Moths described in 1859
Moths of Africa